The 2018–19 La Salle Explorers women's basketball team will represent La Salle University during the 2018–19 NCAA Division I women's basketball season. The Explorers, led by first year head coach Mountain MacGillivray, play their home games at Tom Gola Arena and were members of the Atlantic 10 Conference. They finished the season 6–25, 3–13 in A-10 to finish in a tie for last place. They lost in the first round of the A-10 women's tournament to Dayton.

Media

La Salle Explorers Sports Network
Select Explorers games will be broadcast online by the La Salle Portal. The A-10 Digital Network will carry all non-televised Explorers home games and most conference road games.

Roster

Schedule

|-
!colspan=9 style=| Non-conference Regular season

|-
!colspan=9 style=| Atlantic 10 Regular season

|-
!colspan=9 style=| Atlantic 10 Women's Tournament

Rankings
2018–19 NCAA Division I women's basketball rankings

See also
 2018–19 La Salle Explorers men's basketball team

References

La Salle
La Salle Explorers women's basketball seasons
La Salle
La Salle